Rimrock Jones is a lost 1918 American silent Western film directed by Donald Crisp and starring Wallace Reid.

Cast
 Wallace Reid as Rimrock Jones
 Ann Little as Mary Fortune
 Charles Stanton Ogle as Hassayamp Hicks
 Paul Hurst as Ike Bray
 Guy Oliver as Andrew McBain
 Fred Huntley as Leon Lockhart
 Edna Mae Cooper as Hazel Hardesty
 Tote Du Crow as Juan Soto
 Gustav von Seyffertitz as Stoddard
 Ernest Joy as Jepson
 George Kuwa as Woe Chong
 Mary Mersch as Mrs. Hardesty

Reception
Like many American films of the time, Rimrock Jones was subject to cuts by city and state film censorship boards. The Chicago Board of Censors required cuts, in Reel 1, of two scenes of a Mexican and Jones shooting at each other, the flashing of all roulette scenes, and, in Reel 3, two shooting scenes.

References

External links

 
 
 Surviving lobby posters #one and #two
 Lantern slide
 Coolidge, Dane (1917), Rimrock Jones, New York: Grosset & Dunlap, on the Internet Archive

1918 films
1918 Western (genre) films
Films directed by Donald Crisp
Lost Western (genre) films
Paramount Pictures films
American black-and-white films
Lost American films
1918 lost films
Silent American Western (genre) films
1910s American films